The IS-3 (also known as Object 703) is a Soviet heavy tank developed in late 1944.  Its semi-hemispherical cast turret (resembling that of an upturned soup bowl) became the hallmark of post-war Soviet tanks.  Its pike nose design would also be mirrored by other tanks of the IS tank family such as the IS-7 and T-10.  Too late to see combat in World War II, the IS-3 participated in the Berlin Victory Parade of 1945, the Korean War, in the border conflict during the Sino-Soviet split, the Soviet invasion of Hungary, the Prague Spring, the Russo-Ukraine War, and on both sides during the Six-Day War.

Design and production

Object 703 was developed in late 1944 by Factory No.100 Kirovskiy Works or ChTZ (in Chelyabinsk) and left the factory shop in May 1945. This tank had an improved armour layout, and a semi-hemispherical cast turret (resembling that of an upturned soup bowl), which became the hallmark of post-war Soviet tanks. While this low, hemispherical turret improved protection, it also significantly diminished crew headroom, especially for the loader. The low turret also limited the maximum depression of the main gun, since the gun breech had little room inside the turret to elevate, and this limited the extent to which the IS-3 could take advantage of hull-down positions. The IS-3's pointed prow earned it the nickname Shchuka (Pike) by its crews. It weighed slightly less and stood  lower than previous versions. Wartime production resulted in many mechanical problems and a hull weldline that had a tendency to crack open. The IS-3M solved some of these problems.

The IS-3 came too late to see action in World War II. The first public demonstration of the IS-3 came on 7 September 1945 during the Allied victory parade on Charlottenburger Straße in Berlin, with the heavily reinforced 71st Guards Heavy Tank Regiment of the 2nd Guards Tank Army. Starting in 1960, the IS-3 was slightly modernized as the IS-3M, in a manner similar to the IS-2M.

The IS-3 was a significant improvement to the IS-1 and IS-2 due to its pike nose frontal armor. Having frontal hull armor that was already pre-angled meant that less armor was needed to maintain the same effective armor thickness on the upper glacis.

Combat history
Three pre-series vehicles were assigned to an independent Guards Battalion, but they arrived after the surrender documents were signed. There are some reports of them fighting Jagdpanthers after the surrender. They also took part in the September 7th, 1945 victory parade in Berlin under the 71st Guards Heavy Tank Regiment of the 2nd Guards Tank Army. Other reports indicate that IS-3s saw limited action against Japan in the very last days of WW2. However, no tank-on-tank engagements happened with IS-3s in those battles.

In Stuka Pilot, by Hans-Ulrich Rudel, during the retreat to Berlin from the Eastern front, Rudel encounters an unknown tank in a convoy of Russians. He attacks this new tank, a Stalin, first: anything new was an immediate target as this indicated new weapons development. He then circled back to identify this tank, and to get pictures with the plane mounted camera. During this maneuver, he was brought down by Russian flak. After escaping the Russian patrols, he makes it back to his lines, and continues to head west into Germany to defend the fatherland. During fighting over east Berlin, he encounters another Stalin tank. 

In response to border disputes between the Soviet Union and China, some Soviet IS-3s were dug in as fixed pillboxes along the Soviet-Chinese border. The IS-3 was used in the 1956 Soviet invasion of Hungary, as well as the Prague Spring in 1968.

During the early 1950s, all IS-3s were modernized as IS-3M models. The Egyptian Army acquired about 100 IS-3M tanks from the Soviet Union. During the Six-Day War, a single regiment of IS-3M tanks was stationed with the Egyptian 7th Infantry Division at Rafah and the 125th Tank Brigade of the 6th Mechanized Division at Kuntilla was also equipped with about 60 IS-3M tanks. Israeli infantry and paratrooper units had considerable difficulty with the IS-3M when it was encountered due to its thick armor, which shrugged off hits from normal infantry anti-tank weapons such as the bazooka. Even the 90 mm AP shell fired by the main gun of the Israeli Defense Force (IDF) M48 Patton tanks could not penetrate the frontal armor of the IS-3s at normal battle ranges. There were a number of engagements between the M48A2 Pattons of the IDF 7th Armored Brigade and IS-3s supporting Egyptian positions at Rafah in which several M48A2s were knocked out in the fighting.

However, in one engagement between a battalion of IS-3s and 90 mm gun-armed M48A3s, seven IS-3s were destroyed. The slow rate of fire, poor engine performance (the engine was not well suited to hot-climate operations as it was originally meant to fight the Germans in Europe), and quite rudimentary fire control (fire-control was still relatively WWII-era) of the IS-3s proved to be a significant handicap, but the main factor was not due to mobility and age of armour, but came down to poor morale and training. About 73 IS-3s were lost in the 1967 war. Most Egyptian IS-3 tanks were withdrawn from service, though at least one regiment was retained in service as late as the 1973 October war. The IDF itself experimented with a few captured IS-3M tanks, but found them ill-suited to fast-moving desert tank warfare; those that were not scrapped were turned into stationary defensive pillbox emplacements in the Jordan River area. M48A2s were superior at shorter range, but the IS-3 proved to be superior at longer ranges.

After the Korean War, China attempted to reverse-engineer their IS-2 with data obtained from T-10M as the Type WZ-111 heavy tank. The project was cancelled in favor of the Type 59, a copy of the Soviet T-54A. 
In the 1950s, these were slowly replaced by the T-54, T-55, and T-10.

In 2014, an IS-3 was captured by the Armed Forces of Ukraine near the city of Donetsk from pro-Russian rebels. Footage of the tank being reactivated by the rebels circulated online, showing the tank being successfully started and driven off its plinth at a memorial in the city of Kostiantynivka, Donetsk Oblast. Sources from the People's Republic of Donetsk claim it was able to fire at a military outpost, killing and wounding several soldiers, before retreating and being abandoned.

Models
IS-31944 armor redesign, with new rounded turret, angular front hull casting, integrated stowage bins over the tracks. Internally similar to IS-2 model 1944 and produced concurrently. About 350 built during the war.
IS-3M (1952) Modernized version of IS-3. Fitted with additional jettisonable external fuel tanks, improved hull welding and a new anti-air machine gun.

Operators

 Czechoslovak Army: Two IS-3s were delivered in 1949 but were used only for trials and military parades.

 Russian Armed Forces: Often used in military parades, some others displayed in some parts of Russia.

 Egyptian Army: 100 IS-3M were operated from 1956 to 1967, some in use during the Six-Day War in 1967.

 IDF: Three IS-3M captured from Egypt in 1967. Reused as indirect fire artillery on the Sinai's Bar Lev line and as fixed turret bunkers fortifications along the Jordan Valley frontier.

 Polish Land Forces: Two IS-3s were bought in 1946 for trials only.

 Belgian Armed Forces: One IS-3 is currently being displayed at a museum in Bastogne.

 Hungarian People's Army: Few IS-3M were delivered, but only used for trials. In the Hungarian Revolution of 1956, there were IS-3 tanks with Hungarian flags on the top. They were captured, or delivered earlier from the Soviet Union. Modifications were made by the Hungarian engineers, but the army had to give them back after the end of the conflict.

 Defense Forces of Georgia: Used a handful of IS-3 units a few years after the Soviet Union dissolved, in the autonomous region of South Ossetia.

 South Ossetian Army: Operated IS-3s until 1995.

 Red Army: Accepted into service 29 March 1945.
 Soviet Army

 One IS-3, previously displayed on a pedestal in the village of Aleksandro-Kalynove near Kostiantynivka as a World War II memorial, used in combat by the Novorossiyan Armed Forces in the 2014 pro-Russian unrest in Ukraine. Kostiantynivka was retaken by Ukrainian forces on 7 July 2014, along with the IS-3.

 Several IS-3s donated to the DPRK, where the Korean People's Army formed two regiments. Some sources claim that North Korea is the only remaining nation to have IS-3s in active service.

Surviving vehicles
 IDF Armoured Corps Museum, Israel.
 Museum of Armoured Arms, Training Center of Land Forces, Poznań, Poland (still operational)
 Army Technical Museum, Lešany, Czech Republic (operational).
 Polish Army Museum, Warsaw, Poland. (Fort Czerniaków branch of the Museum).
 National Armor and Cavalry Museum, Fort Benning, Georgia, United States.
 Victory Park in the northern part of Ulyanovsk, Russia.
 Ulyanovskoe SVU, Ulyanovsk, Russia
 Military Glory Museum, Gomel, Belarus.
 Diorama Battle of Kursk, in Belgorod, Russia.
 At least one IS-3 was used by the separatist government in Donbas before being captured by Ukrainian forces. Another IS-3 was filmed being successfully started and driven off its plinth at a memorial to the Great Patriotic War in Kostiantynivka, where it was then reportedly used by Pro-Russian rebels on June 30, 2014.
 IS-3 re-engined with unknown replacement power plant restored and available for tourist rides Strategic Missile Forces Museum near Pobuzke, Ukraine.
 IS-3M
 Egyptian National Military Museum, Cairo Citadel, Egypt.
 Military Vehicle Technology Foundation, California, United States.
 Royal Museum of the Armed Forces and of Military History, Brussels, Belgium. (Still operational)
 Bastogne barracks Museum, Bastogne, Belgium

See also
KV-1
IS tank family
T-10
ISU-122
ISU-152
List of Soviet tanks

Tanks of comparable role
German Tiger II heavy tank
British Conqueror heavy tank
French AMX 50 prototype heavy tank
American M103 (heavy tank) heavy tank
American T34 prototype heavy tank
American T30 prototype heavy tank

References

Cold War tanks of the Soviet Union
Heavy tanks of the Soviet Union
Military vehicles introduced from 1945 to 1949